Playing for Time may refer to:
 Playing for Time (film), a 1980 American TV movie written by Arthur Miller
 Playing for Time or Sursis pour l'orchestre, a book by Fania Fénelon
 Playing for Time (game show), a 2000-01 UK quiz programme
 "Playing for Time", a song by Buzzcocks from All Set
 "Playing for Time", a song by Uriah Heep, a non-album B-side from Head First
 "Playing for Time", a song by Peter Gabriel from his upcoming album i/o